Katarzyna Wójcik (born 31 March 1983) is a Polish modern pentathlete. At the 2012 Summer Olympics, she competed in the women's competition, finishing in 19th place.

References

External links
 

Polish female modern pentathletes
Living people
Olympic modern pentathletes of Poland
Modern pentathletes at the 2012 Summer Olympics
1983 births
Sportspeople from Częstochowa